Old Stuff – Part 3 is a compilation album by American grindcore band Anal Cunt. It contains a demo recorded for a Boston hardcore compilation called Hurts Like a Motherfucker that was never released (most of these songs were later rerecorded for the album I Like It When You Die). It also contains songs from The Raunchous Brothers split 7-inch, songs from various tribute compilations, and other previously unreleased songs. It was released on CD on July 24, 2008, and on LP in April 2009. The LP comes with an exclusive poster. All songs on this album were recorded in the mid-to-late 1990s.

Track listing

Personnel
Seth Putnam – vocals, drums on tracks 20–23
Josh Martin – guitar (except tracks 22 and 23)
Nate Linehan – drums (except tracks 20–23)
Scott Hull – guitar on tracks 22 and 23

References

Anal Cunt albums
2008 compilation albums